Frank Lee Duncan III (June 1, 1920 – October 2, 1999) was an American Negro league pitcher in the 1940s.

A native of Kansas City, Missouri, Duncan was the son of fellow Negro leaguer Frank Lee Duncan Jr. He played for the Kansas City Monarchs in 1941, served in the US Army during World War II, and returned to play for the Baltimore Elite Giants in 1945. Duncan played alongside his father with the Monarchs in 1941, and they are thought to have been the first father-son battery in major league history. He died in Detroit, Michigan in 1999 at age 79.

References

External links
 and Seamheads

1920 births
1999 deaths
Baltimore Elite Giants players
Kansas City Monarchs players
Baseball pitchers
Baseball players from Kansas City, Missouri
United States Army personnel of World War II
African Americans in World War II
African-American United States Army personnel